Roger la Honte is a 1946 French historical drama film directed by André Cayatte and starring Lucien Coëdel, María Casares and Paul Bernard. The film is an adaptation of the novel of the same name by Jules Mary. It was followed by a sequel The Revenge of Roger featuring many of the original cast and released the same year.

The film's sets were designed by the art director René Renoux.

Cast
 Lucien Coëdel as Roger Laroque 
 María Casares as Julia de Noirville 
 Paul Bernard as Luversan 
 Renée Devillers as Mme Laroque 
 Rellys as Tristot 
 Jean Tissier as Le baron de Cé 
 Louis Salou as Le commissaire Lacroix 
 André Gabriello as Pivolot 
 Josée Conrad as La petite Suzanne 
 Jean Debucourt as Monsieur de Noirville 
 Paulette Dubost as Victoire 
 Léon Walther as Le président du tribunal 
 Léonce Corne
 Paul Demange
 Bernard Hubrenne
 Philippe Lemaire
 Charles Lemontier 
 Marcel Pérès
 Madeleine Suffel

References

Bibliography 
 Goble, Alan. The Complete Index to Literary Sources in Film. Walter de Gruyter, 1999.

External links 
 

1946 films
French historical drama films
1940s historical drama films
1940s French-language films
Films directed by André Cayatte
Films based on French novels
Films set in the 19th century
French black-and-white films
1940s French films